KPTH (channel 44) is a television station in Sioux City, Iowa, United States, affiliated with Fox and CBS. It is owned by the Sinclair Broadcast Group, which provides certain services to Dabl affiliate KMEG (channel 14) under a shared services agreement (SSA) with Waitt Broadcasting. The two stations share studios along I-29 (postal address says Gold Circle) in Dakota Dunes, South Dakota; KPTH's transmitter is located in unincorporated Plymouth County, Iowa, east of James and US 75 along the Woodbury County line.

History
The station signed on May 9, 1999 as the market's fifth television outlet. Airing an analog signal on UHF channel 44, KPTH, originally owned by Pappas Telecasting, immediately joined Fox. Prior to KPTH's launch, future sister station KMEG carried a secondary affiliation with the network; additional coverage was provided via the network's affiliates in Sioux Falls, Omaha, and Des Moines, all of which carried the network's programs in pattern. Initially at its sign-on, channel 44 only covered the Sioux City metro area before increasing to full-power in October 1999. This upgrade extended the station's coverage to include the 23 counties that make up the Sioux City designated market area. KPTH quickly became Siouxland's most-watched station and was a member of the "Fox #1 Club" in 2004 and 2005. The station also began to air the entire Fox lineup nightly.

In May 2005, Waitt Broadcasting (owner of KMEG) entered into a shared services agreement with Pappas Telecasting. Although KPTH was designated the senior partner in the arrangement, it moved into KMEG's facility. In November 2007, Waitt announced it would sell KMEG to Siouxland Television, LLC, with Pappas continuing to operate it as part of the deal. However, Pappas' Sioux City duopoly was among the company's thirteen stations which filed for Chapter 11 bankruptcy protection. As a result, the sale of KMEG to Siouxland Television fell through. On January 16, 2009, it was announced several of the Pappas stations involved in the bankruptcy (including KPTH) would be sold to New World TV Group after the transaction received United States bankruptcy court approval. The change in ownership was completed on October 15, 2009, and on that day, New World TV Group took over the SSA with KMEG.

TTBG announced the sale of most of its stations, including KPTH, to the Sinclair Broadcast Group on June 3, 2013. The sale was finalized on September 30.

Programming

Syndicated programming
Syndicated programming on KPTH includes Maury, Divorce Court, Hot Bench, Family Feud, and The Big Bang Theory, while syndicated programming seen on KPTH-DT3 includes Wheel of Fortune, Jeopardy! and Judge Judy.

News operation
On October 9, 2006, KMEG began producing a weeknight prime time newscast on KPTH. Known as Siouxland News at Nine on Fox 44, the broadcast can currently be seen for thirty minutes. Although KPTH is the senior partner in the SSA, KMEG produces the newscasts on both stations. On October 25, 2010, KMEG became the first station in the market to upgrade its news operation to 16:9 enhanced definition widescreen. Although not truly high definition, the broadcasts matched the ratio of HD television screens. The weeknight news at 9 on KPTH was included in the change. On April 15, 2013, KMEG and KPTH completed an upgrade to full high definition news broadcasts, two years after competitors KCAU-TV and KTIV.

Subchannels
The station's digital signal is multiplexed:

On January 20, 2021, KPTH announced that CBS programming would move to its third subchannel, effective February 4, ending 54 years of the CBS affiliation on KMEG. To accommodate the switch, Charge! moved to the second subchannel of KMEG, replacing TBD, which joined MyNetworkTV on KPTH's second subchannel. Dabl programming moved to the first subchannel of KMEG, making it the primary affiliate.

Analog-to-digital conversion 
KPTH shut down its analog signal, over UHF channel 44, at noon on February 17, 2009, to conclude the federally mandated transition from analog to digital television. The station's digital signal remained on its pre-transition UHF channel 49, using PSIP to display KPTH's virtual channel as 44 on digital television receivers.

Translators
KPTH's signal is repeated over two translators.

References

External links
KPTH/KMEG (can be entered into web-enabled mobile device for wireless access)

Television channels and stations established in 1999
1999 establishments in Iowa
PTH
Fox network affiliates
MyNetworkTV affiliates
This TV affiliates
CBS network affiliates
Sinclair Broadcast Group